Dušan Karol and Jaroslav Pospíšil were the defending champions, but Pospíšil didn't start this year.
Karol partnered up with Olivier Charroin, but they lost in the semifinal with Decoud and López Jaén.
Sebastián Decoud and Miguel Ángel López Jaén defeated Ivan Dodig and Antonio Veić in the final 6–4, 6–4.

Seeds

Draw

Draw

References
 Doubles Draw

Rijeka Open - Doubles
Rijeka Open - Singles
Rijeka Open